Fenerbahçe Rowing is the men's and women's rowing section of Fenerbahçe S.K., a major sports club in Istanbul, Turkey. Fenerbahçe Rowers use the Dereağzı Facilities as homeground. Founded in 1914, both the men's and women's rowing teams are the most successful in Turkey, having won the Turkish Men's Rowing Championship a record 35 times and the Women's Rowing Championship a record 18 times, amongst others.

Honours (Men)

International competitions
Head of the Charles Regatta
3rd place (1): 2006 
4th place (1): 2002 
5th place (1): 2014
D-Inverno International Marathon Rowing Championships
4th place (1): 2007
Croatia Open Zagreb
Winners (1): 2006

National competitions
Turkish Rowing Championship
Winners (35) (record): 1951, 1955, 1962, 1963, 1964, 1965, 1968, 1969, 1976, 1977, 1978, 1979, 1980, 1981, 1982, 1983, 1984, 1985, 1986, 1990, 1991, 1995, 1996, 1997, 1998, 1999, 2001, 2002, 2003, 2004, 2005, 2006, 2008, 2011, 2014
Turkish Rowing Cup
Winners (31) (record) 1977, 1978, 1979, 1980, 1981, 1982, 1983, 1984, 1985, 1986, 1990, 1991, 1995, 1996, 1997, 1998, 1999, 2000, 2001, 2002, 2003, 2005, 2006, 2007, 2008, 2009, 2011, 2012, 2014, 2016, 2017
Istanbul Championship
Winners (37) (record): 1922, 1923, 1924, 1925, 1926, 1951, 1954, 1955, 1962, 1963, 1964, 1968, 1969, 1970, 1973, 1976, 1977, 1978, 1979, 1980, 1981, 1982, 1983, 1984, 1985, 1986, 1987, 1988, 1994, 1996, 1997, 1998, 1999, 2000, 2001, 2002, 2003
Istanbul Cup
Winners (30) (record): 1965, 1966, 1967, 1968, 1972, 1976, 1977, 1978, 1979, 1980, 1981, 1982, 1983, 1984, 1985, 1986, 1987, 1988, 1989, 1990, 1991, 1994, 1995, 1996, 1998, 1999, 2000, 2001, 2002, 2003
GSGM Cup
Winners (6): 2000, 2001, 2003, 2005, 2006, 2007 
Mediterranean Cup
Winners (5): 2000, 2002, 2004, 2007, 2008 
Naval Academy Cup
Winners (4): 2000, 2003, 2004, 2006

Honours (Women)

National competitions
Turkish Women's Rowing Championship
Winners (18) (record): 1976, 1977, 1978, 1979, 1980, 1985, 1990, 1991, 1992, 2003, 2004, 2005, 2006, 2007, 2011, 2014, 2015, 2016
Turkish Rowing Cup
Winners (3): 2003, 2011, 2014

Technical staff

Notable former rowers
Fitnat Özdil (1910–1993)
Melek Özdil (1916– )
Nezihe Özdil (1911–1984)
Vecihe Taşçı (1905–2002)
Levent Darkanat (1977-1979)

References

External links
Official Fenerbahçe website 

Rowing
Sport in Kadıköy
Rowing clubs in Turkey
1914 establishments in the Ottoman Empire